Civilian casualties occur when civilians are killed or injured by non-civilians, mostly law enforcement officers,  military personnel, rebel group forces, or terrorists. Under the law of war, it refers to civilians who perish or suffer wounds as a result of wartime acts. The term is generally applied to situations in which violence is committed in pursuit of political goals.  During periods of armed conflict, there are structures, actors, and processes at a number of levels that affect the likelihood of violence against civilians.

The term "civilian casualties" is sometimes used  in non-military situations, for example to distinguish casualties to police vs. to criminals such as bank robbers.

Overview

In times of armed conflict, despite numerous advancements in technology, the European Union's European Security Strategy, adopted by the European Council in Brussels in December 2003, stated that since 1990, almost 4 million people have died in wars, 90% of them civilians. However, United Nations Children's Fund (UNICEF) reports that civilian fatalities have climbed from 5 per cent at the turn of the century to more than 90 per cent in the wars of the 1990s.

Generating reliable assessments of casualties of war is a notoriously complex process. Civilian casualties present particular difficulties. One problem is that the attribution of the label 'civilian' is contested in some cases. On the surface, the definition of a civilian, at least in the context of international armed conflicts, is relatively simple: a civilian is any person who is not a member of the armed forces and is not a combatant in situation of armed conflict. To make effective use of such statistics as there are about civilian casualties of war, it is necessary to be explicit about the criteria for inclusion. All too often, there is a lack of clarity about which of the following categories of civilian casualties are included in any given set of figures.
 Those killed as a direct effect of war;
 Those injured as a direct effect of war;
 Those dying, whether during or after a war, from indirect effects of war such as disease, malnutrition and lawlessness, and who would not have been expected to die at such rates from such causes in the absence of the war;
 Victims of one-sided violence, such as when states slaughter their own citizens in connection with a war; 
 Victims of rape and other forms of sexual violence in connection with a war;
 Those uprooted in a war – that is, refugees and Internally Displaced Persons (IDPs);
 Those who, even after a war is over, die prematurely from injuries sustained in war.

The inclusion of people in each of these categories may be defensible, but needs to be explicit. Each category presents its own methodological problems. In the case of people dying from indirect effects (category 3), much careful work is needed to distinguish between 'expected' and 'excess' levels of mortality. In the case of victims of sexual crimes (category 5) there could be an argument for including not only direct crimes by combatants, but also 'indirect' crimes due to general social collapse. In the case of those uprooted in war (category 6), the implication that refugees and IDPs always count as war victims is too simple. Some may be fleeing one-sided violence from a repressive state apparatus, natural calamity, or general social breakdown. Moreover, in certain episodes, such as the Indo-Pakistani War of 1971, the Kosovo War of 1999, and the Afghanistan War of 2001, military campaigns have enabled large numbers of refugees to return home. Indeed, in the 1971 and 1999 wars, refugee return was a stated reason for launching hostilities. Yet this key observation finds remarkably little reflection in the literature about the casualties of contemporary war. A focus on the numbers of those uprooted in war is especially problematic as those who are trapped in conflict zones may in fact be worse off than those uprooted, but seldom feature in statistics. Figures for war deaths and for war-related migration should be presented separately, not amalgamated.

International law

Following the Second World War, a series of treaties governing the laws of war were adopted starting in 1949. These Geneva Conventions would come into force, in no small part, because of a general reaction against the practices of the Second World War. Although the Fourth Geneva Convention attempted to erect some legal defenses for civilians in time of war, the bulk of the Fourth Convention devoted to explicating civilian rights in occupied territories, and no explicit attention is paid to the problems of bombardment and the hazardous effects in the combat-zone.

In 1977, Protocol I was adopted as an amendment to the Geneva Conventions, prohibiting the deliberate or indiscriminate attack of civilians and civilian objects in the war-zone and the attacking force must take precautions and steps to spare the lives of civilians and civilian objects as possible. Although ratified by 173 countries, the only countries that are currently not signatories to Protocol I are the United States, Israel, Iran, Pakistan, India, and Turkey.

The Rome Statute defines that "intentionally directing attacks against the civilian population" to be illegal, but only came into effect on 1 July 2002 and has not been ratified by every country.

Ethics 
Many modern nations' views on the ethics of civilian casualties align with the Just War theory, which advocates a system of proportionality. An act of war is deemed proportional in Just War theory if the overall destruction expected from the use of force is outweighed by the projected good to be achieved. This view is a war-adapted version of utilitarianism, the moral system which advocates that the morally correct action is the one that does the most good.

However, moral philosophers often contest this approach to war. Such theorists advocate absolutism, which holds there are various ethical rules that are, as the name implies, absolute. One such rule is that non-combatants cannot be attacked because they are, by definition, not partaking in combat; to attack non-combatants anyway, regardless of the expected outcome, is to deny them agency. Thus, by the absolutist view, only enemy combatants can be attacked. The philosopher Thomas Nagel advocates this absolutist rule in his essay "War and Massacre".

Finally, the approach of pacifism is the belief that war of any kind is morally unjust. Pacifists sometimes extend humanitarian concern not just to enemy civilians but also to enemy combatants, especially conscripts.

Refugees
The laws of war have changed over the course of history, and international protocols like the Fourth Geneva Convention explicitly provide legal protections to civilians in territories occupied by a belligerent party during and after an international armed conflict. The 1951 Refugee Convention and the 1967 Protocol Relating to the Status of Refugees has also given protection to people who have a well founded fear of persecution.

Some researchers have included refugees and internally displaced persons in their definition of "civilian casualty".

Civilian casualty ratio

The civilian casualty ratio in an armed conflict is the ratio of civilian casualties to combatant casualties or total casualties. The measurement can apply either to casualties inflicted by a particular belligerent or to casualties in the conflict as a whole.

The ratio of ten civilian casualties for every combatant is a frequently-cited, but disputed figure.

Collateral damage

Collateral damage is defined in terms of armed conflict as unavoidable or accidental killing or injury of non-combatants or unavoidable or accidental destruction of non-combatant property caused by attacks on legitimate military targets.

See also

Casualty recording
Casualty (person)
 Concentration camps
 List of concentration and internment camps
 Nazi concentration camps
 Wartime sexual violence

References

Further reading 

 Counting Civilian Casualties: An Introduction to Recording and Estimating Non-military Deaths in Conflict.
 Twentieth Century Atlas - Death Tolls WAR STATS REDIRECT WAR STATS REDIRECT WAR STATS REDIRECT  Twentieth Century Atlas - Death Tolls Twentieth Century Atlas - Death Tolls Twentieth Century Atlas - Death Tolls 
 Selected Death Tolls for Wars, Massacres and Atrocities Before the 20th Century 
 The world's worst massacres, by Greg Brecht. Fall, 1987. Whole Earth Review.

 
Law of war
International criminal law
War casualties